Anushka Singh (born 9 November 1964) is an Indian model and actress who has worked in Hindi television serials and short films.

Television

References

Indian soap opera actresses
Living people
Place of birth missing (living people)
Indian female models
1964 births